These are the results of the Men's Long Jump event at the 2001 World Championships in Athletics in Edmonton, Alberta, Canada.

Medalists

Schedule
All times are Mountain Standard Time (UTC-7)

Results

Qualification
Qualification: Qualifying Performance 8.15 (Q) or at least 12 best performers (q) advance to the final.

Final

References
Results
IAAF

Long Jump
Long jump at the World Athletics Championships